Corny Point is a locality in the Australian state of South Australia located about  to the east of the north-western tip of the Yorke Peninsula. It was named after the nearby headland, Corny Point. The first pastoral lease was taken up in 1846 by James Coutts.

The 2016 Australian census which was conducted in August 2016 reports that Corny Point had 105 people living within its boundaries.

Corny Point is located within the federal division of Grey, the state electoral district of Narungga and the local government area of the Yorke Peninsula Council.

See also
List of cities and towns in South Australia
Thidna Conservation Park
Carribie Conservation Park

References

External links

Yorke Peninsula: Corny Point

Yorke Peninsula
Coastal towns in South Australia
Spencer Gulf